Siar, also known as Lak, Lamassa, or Likkilikki, is an Austronesian language spoken in New Ireland Province in the southern island point of Papua New Guinea. Lak is in the Patpatar-Tolai sub-group, which then falls under the New Ireland-Tolai group in the Western Oceanic language, a sub-group within the Austronesian family. The Siar people keep themselves sustained and nourished by fishing and gardening. The native people call their language , which means 'our language'.

Phonology

The vowel  can be thought to be pronounced in between the high vowel  and the mid vowel , as well as  being in between the high vowel  and the mid vowel , according to the native people in Papua New Guinea. ẹ can be written as é, and ọ can also be written as ỏ. Knowing which vowel is used when writing is critical, as two words that are similar can have completely different meanings. For example,  means to 'carry in arms', while  means 'to fly'. Also,  has a meaning of 'to be able', while  means 'sugarcane'.

Stress and phonotactics
Stress is placed on the last syllable in each word. Examples of words broken down into syllables and translated include:

Syllable structures
Siar Lak contains four different types of syllable patterns in their word vocabulary, which include V(vowel), VC(vowel consonant), CV(consonant vowel), and CVC(consonant vowel consonant). Some examples include:

Numerical system

Orthography
Orthography is the way words are written, using the appropriate letters from a specific language while following usage rules. If the consonant phoneme  is used at the beginning of a word, that word starts with an f, but if it is found at the end of a word, it is then replaced with the letter h.

Pronouns

Example sentence:

Verb phrases
Two types of verb phrases include intransitive and transitive verbs. An intransitive verb is used when there is no direct object, while a transitive verb is used when there is a direct object action taking place. An intransitive verb for 'eat' would be , while a transitive verb for 'eat' would be .

References

 
 
 

Languages of New Ireland Province
St George linkage